Anabel Medina Garrigues, although the defending champion, lost to Laura Pous Tió in the second round.

Iveta Benešová defeated Simona Halep in the final 6-4, 6-2.

Seeds

Draw

Finals

Top half

Bottom half

References
Main Draw
Qualifying Singles

Grand Prix SAR La Princesse Lalla Meryem - Singles
Morocco Open
2010 in Moroccan tennis